Blaxland Creek, a watercourse that is part of the Hawkesbury–Nepean catchment, is located in Greater Western Sydney, Australia.

Course and features

Blaxland Creek, on Department of Defence land near Penrith, is probably the last near-pristine freshwater stream in the Cumberland Plain. Blaxland Creek, because it has been relatively untouched by development, can be used not only as a touchstone for understanding the biodiversity of other freshwater streams on the Cumberland Plain but as a way of reintroducing native species to other streams.

The creek in named in honour of Gregory Blaxland, a pioneer farmer and explorer who was granted land in the Orchard Hills area from 1810.

See also 

 Rivers of New South Wales

References 

Creeks and canals of Sydney
Hawkesbury River